Karolina Semeniuk-Olchawa (born 24 October 1983 in Żory) is a Polish handball player. She plays for the club MKS Zagłębie Lubin, the Polish national team and represented Poland at the 2013 World Women's Handball Championship in Serbia.

References

External links
Player profile at the Polish Handball Association website 

Polish female handball players
1983 births
Living people
People from Żory
Sportspeople from Silesian Voivodeship
21st-century Polish women